The 2014 season was the Carolina Panthers' 20th in the National Football League and their fourth under head coach Ron Rivera.

The Panthers captured their second straight NFC South division title and qualified for the postseason for the first time in back-to-back years despite failing to improve on a 12–4 record and finishing with a losing record of 7–8–1. Additionally, they became the first team in NFC South history to have back to back division titles and also became the second team to win a division title with a sub-.500 record after the 2010 Seattle Seahawks, and would be followed by the 2020 Washington Football Team, a team that Rivera also coached. The Panthers defeated the Arizona Cardinals in the Wild Card round, but lost to Seattle in the Divisional round.

The Panthers' four-game winning streak to close out the regular season, combined with a 14–0 start the following year, was tied with the 2003–2004 New England Patriots for the third longest regular season winning streak in NFL history, at 18.

2014 Draft Class

Staff

Final roster

Schedule

Preseason
The Panthers' preseason opponents were announced on April 9, 2014.

Regular season

Note: Intra-division opponents are in bold text.

Postseason

Game summaries

Regular season

Week 1: at Tampa Bay Buccaneers

Derek Anderson made his first start as Panthers QB, substituting for Cam Newton who was nursing a rib injury he'd suffered during the preseason. The change in QB didn't appear to faze the team, as the Panthers won their first season opener in six years, 20-14. They started the season 1-0 and improved to 1-0 without Newton starting.

Week 2: vs. Detroit Lions

Newton returned to the starting lineup with some added padding around his ribs. The game's highlight was a defensive interception against Lions star WR Calvin "Megatron" Johnson. With the win, the Panthers improved to 2-0 and 16-5 when Newton doesn't commit a turnover.

Week 3: vs. Pittsburgh Steelers

This was the first Sunday Night Football home game for the Panthers since 2009. With the loss, the Panthers dropped to 2-1. Newton left the game due to injury but he fumbled the ball. This dropped the team to 10-20 when he commits a turnover.

Week 4: at Baltimore Ravens

This game marked the first time WR Steve Smith Sr. played against his former team after being cut in the offseason. He was clearly fired up, recording over 100 yards receiving and two touchdown receptions. With the loss, the Panthers record was 2-2.  The team dropped to 16-6 when Newton doesn't commit a turnover.

Week 5: vs. Chicago Bears

With the win, the Panthers improved to 3-2.  They would also improve to 11-20 when Newton commits at least one turnover. Unknown at the time, this would be the team's last victory for over two months.

Week 6: at Cincinnati Bengals

Both teams went back and forth scoring and holding the opposing offense without scoring. This would be the highest-scoring overtime tie in NFL history, as well as the first tie in Panthers history as their record stood at 3-2-1.  The team's record then stood at 11-20-1 when Newton commits a turnover.

Week 7: at Green Bay Packers

With the loss, the Panthers dropped to 3-3-1.  The team also dropped to 11-21-1 when Newton turns the ball over.

Week 8: vs. Seattle Seahawks

With the loss, the Panthers dropped to 3-4-1.  The team also dropped to 11-22-1 when Newton commits at least one turnover.

Week 9: vs. New Orleans Saints

With the loss, the Panthers dropped to 3-5-1.  The team would sit at 11-23-1 when Newton turns the ball over.

Week 10: at Philadelphia Eagles

On Monday Night Football, Carolina barely put up a fight. The Eagles easily won the game, their defense sacking Cam Newton nine times. This dropped the Panthers record to 3-6-1.  They also fell to 11-24-1 when Newton commits at least one turnover.

Week 11: vs. Atlanta Falcons

With their fifth straight loss, the Panthers headed into their bye week at 3-7-1.  Also the team dropped to 11-25-1 when Newton commits a turnover. This would be Carolina's last home loss until week 3 of 2016 against Minnesota.

Week 13: at Minnesota Vikings

With the loss, the Panthers dropped to 3-8-1 and 11-26-1 when Newton commits at least one turnover.

Week 14: at New Orleans Saints

With their 6-game losing streak snapped, the Panthers improved to 4-8-1.  The team also improved to 17-6 when Newton doesn't commit a turnover.

Week 15: vs. Tampa Bay Buccaneers

QB Derek Anderson was pressed into service for the second time in 2014, as Newton had injured his back in a car accident earlier that week. Once again, Anderson led the Panthers to a close victory over Tampa Bay, completing a season sweep and improving the team's record to 5-8-1. Anderson improved his starting regular season record as a Panther to 2-0.

Week 16: vs. Cleveland Browns

With the win, the Panthers improved to 6-8-1 and 12-26-1 when Newton turns the ball over at least once.

Week 17: at Atlanta Falcons

The Panthers finished their season in Atlanta against the Falcons with the NFC South title and the NFC's #4 seed on the line.  They would blowout Atlanta and finish the season out 7-8-1. The team would also improve to 18-6 when Newton doesn't commit a turnover.

Postseason

NFC Wild Card Playoffs: vs. #5 Arizona Cardinals

The win over the Cardinals improved the Panthers' overall record to 8-8-1, with the defense turning in a record performance, holding Arizona to 78 total yards. Their record stood at 13-26-1 when Cam turns the ball over.

NFC Divisional Playoffs: at #1 Seattle Seahawks

The loss made the Panthers finish 8-9-1 overall and 13-27-1 when Newton turns the ball over.

Standings

Division

Conference

Notes

References

External links
 

Carolina
Carolina Panthers seasons
NFC South championship seasons
Carolina